Rick Santos (born May 8, 1959) is a retired American drag racer known for winning five consecutive NHRA championships in the Top Alcohol Dragster category from 1997-2001.

Santos, who at age 24 had driven nothing faster than a Chevrolet Vega, began driving his father George's small-block-Chevy-powered Top Alcohol Dragster in 1984. His first win was at the 1986 Winternationals. In 1991, Santos won both the Winternationals and the NHRA Finals. Santos scored three wins in 1993, included at the prestigious U.S. Nationals. Santos' car at the time was popular with fans because his small-block Chevy combination was competitive in a class dominated by Hemi engines. The Santos family parked their car prior to the 1996 season due to rule changes that would require them to add 120 pounds to their car and thus take away their competitive edge.

Santos began driving for Jack O'Bannon Racing in 1996. O'Bannon's team had switched from boat racing to NHRA and retained crew chief Norm Grimes. The team hit the ground running and won five consecutive championships between 1997 and 2001. Santos and O'Bannon cut their racing schedule down to just three races in 2002, and Santos retired from driving at the end of that season.

Santos retired with 36 national event wins, 38 division wins, five NHRA championships, and 7 division championships. Santos operates S&S Automotive in San Leandro, California, and spends time with wife Kelly and sons Kyle and Nick.

References

NHRA: Rick Santos and the Oakwood Homes Team Have Success Through Teamwork; May 27, 1999, Retrieved December 20, 2007
Pomona Rick Santos Preview; November 11, 1998, Retrieved December 20, 2007
Dallas Rick Santos Fall Preview; October 13, 1998, Retrieved December 20, 2007
Santos' 5.39 proves he's ready for Pomona; 1999; Retrieved December 20, 2007

1959 births
Living people
Dragster drivers
American racing drivers